Gray Peak is a prominent rock summit in the Queen Maud Mountains of Antarctica. The mountain is located on the west side of Canyon Glacier, opposite the Hughes Range. The mountain was named in 1958 by the Advisory Committee on Antarctic Names (US-ACAN), after Thomas I. Gray, Jr., a meteorologist at Little America V.

References 

Queen Maud Mountains
Mountains of the Ross Dependency
Dufek Coast